Navaconcejo is a municipality located in the province of Cáceres, Extremadura, Spain. According to the 2010 census (INE), the municipality has a population of 2046 inhabitants.

References 

Municipalities in the Province of Cáceres